Soldatovia is a monospecific genus of marine ray-finned fish belonging to the family Stichaeidae, the pricklebacks and shannies. Its only species is Soldatovia polyactocephala, found in the northwestern Pacific Ocean.

References

Chirolophinae
Fish described in 1814
Taxa named by Peter Simon Pallas
Monotypic ray-finned fish genera